Swainton is an unincorporated community located within Middle Township in Cape May County, New Jersey, United States. U.S. Route 9 and the Garden State Parkway are major roads of Swainton. Avalon is a coastal community directly across from Swainton, connected by Avalon Boulevard.

A post office was established in 1896, with Luther Swain as the first postmaster.

Swainton is home to Union League National Golf Club—a 27-hole golf course offering an  clubhouse.

Education
Swainton is within the Middle Township School District which operates Middle Township High School.

Countywide schools include Cape May County Technical High School and Cape May County Special Services School District.

References

Middle Township, New Jersey
Unincorporated communities in Cape May County, New Jersey
Unincorporated communities in New Jersey